Erik Freitag (born 1 February 1940) is an Austrian composer and violinist.

Life 
Born in Vienna, Freitag studied violin at the University of Music and Performing Arts Vienna, with, among others, Eduard Melkus and composition with Karl-Birger Blomdahl at the Royal Swedish Academy of Music.

From 1964 to 1967, he was violinist in the Sveriges Radio Symfoniorchester and from 1967 to 1970 in the Stockholms Filharmoniska Orchester. He then directed the Vienna-Ottakring Music School until 2003.

Awards 
 1975: Förderungspreis des Bundesministeriums für Unterricht und Kunst
 1979: Förderungspreis der Stadt Wien
 1988: Theodor Körner Prize
 1996: Composer in Residence der Northwestern University of Michigan

Work 

 Hymnus – cantata for speaker, tenor, mixed choir, alto flute, harp, vibraphone and violin, 1970
 Kleine Suite für Streicher und Klavier, 1972
 Moving Studies – Szenen für Tänzer, 1973
 Drei Stücke für Streichquartett, 1976
 Drei Miniaturen für Klavier zu vier Händen, 1977
 Divertimento für Bläserquintett, 1977
 Transformationen – für Violine und Klavier nach der lettischen Weise "Araji, ecetaji", 1978
 Suite für Orchester – aus ‘Moving Studies’, 1978
 Limericks – (5 songs for mezzo and 6 instruments), 1978
 Zwei Sätze für Streicher, 1980
 Sonate (Nachtstücke) für Violine und Viola, 1980
 Suite für die Jugend for Orchestra, 1981
 Elegie und Tanz für Oboe und Streichquartett, 1981
 Ouverture danoise for Orchestra, 1982
 El retablo de la catedral de Tarragona, 1982, 1992, 2000
 Quasi una marcia for chamber orchestra, 1983
 Strindberg – Licht und Schatten – (ljus och skugga), 1985, 2008
 Linee per violino solo, 1985
 Drei Stücke für Klavier, 1985
 Hommage à un grand artiste, 1986
 Triade, 1987
 Passages in the wind – (baritone and 7 instruments), 1987
 Konzert für Violine und Orchester, 1998
 Seis canciones castellanas, 1989
 Quintett 1989
 Zwölf Duos für zwei Violinen, 1990
 Sonate für Violoncello und Klavier, 1990
 Reflections in air für Streichtrio, 1990
 Helle Nacht für Streichorchester, 1990
 Augenblick eines Fauns für Altflöte, 1990
 Nocturne, 1992
 Idun, 1992
 Yotziguanazí – Tres leyendas centroamericanas, 1994
 Triaphonie I, 1995
 Soul-Sky – after the poem by John Gracen Brown, 1995
 Immagini, 1995
 Circuits Magiques – pour quatuor à cordes, 1996
 Triaphonie II, 1997
 Triaphonie III, 1998
 in der todesstunde von alfons alfred schmidt, Stage play for singers, speaker and 7 instrumentalists, 1998
 Quintett 2000
 6 Lieder für mittlere Stimme und Schlagzeug, 2000
 Triaphonie IV, 2001
 Canciones Espanolas Antiguas, 2001
 Concerto da Camera for chamber orchestra, 2002
 Pablos Galerie, 2004
 Marsyas&Apollo, 2004
 En svensk jullegend (A Swedish Christmas legend), 2005
 Triaphonie V – Omar Khayyam, 2006
 Concertino für Marimba und Streicher, 2006

References

Further reading 
 Eintrag Freitag Erik, in Österreichisches Musiklexikon online

External links 
 

20th-century classical composers
21st-century classical composers
20th-century Austrian composers
20th-century Austrian male musicians
Austrian classical violinists
1940 births
Living people
Musicians from Vienna